The Giro dell'Umbria was a single-day road bicycle race held annually in Umbria, Italy from 1910 to 1991. After 1991, the race was merged with the newly created Trofeo Melinda.

Winners

References

Cycle races in Italy
Classic cycle races
Recurring sporting events established in 1910
1910 establishments in Italy
1991 disestablishments in Italy
Recurring sporting events disestablished in 1991
Defunct cycling races in Italy